In the geologic timescale, the Aeronian is an age of the  Llandovery Epoch of the Silurian Period of the Paleozoic Era of the Phanerozoic Eon that began 440.8 ± 1.2 Ma and ended 438.5 ± 1.1 Ma (million years ago). The Aeronian Age succeeds the Rhuddanian Age and precedes the Telychian Age, all in the same epoch.

GSSP 
The GSSP is located in the Trefawr Track section, 500m north of Cwm-coed-Aeron Farm, Wales, UK. The GSSP lies within the gently-dipping blocky mudstones of the Trefawr Formation, which principally yield abundant and diverse shelly faunas, but also contain enough graptolites to allow recognition of several biozones.

References 

 
Llandovery epoch
Silurian geochronology